Václav Bubník (1 January 1926 in Prague – 27 March 1990) was a Czech ice hockey player who competed in the 1952 Winter Olympics and in the 1956 Winter Olympics.

References

1926 births
1990 deaths
Czech ice hockey defencemen
Olympic ice hockey players of Czechoslovakia
Ice hockey players at the 1952 Winter Olympics
Ice hockey players at the 1956 Winter Olympics
Ice hockey people from Prague
HC Vítkovice players
Czechoslovak ice hockey defencemen